Marian Julia James (7 August 183010 November 1910), also known as Miss James, was an English philanthropist. She inherited money from a friend and built a house in Hindhead, Surrey. Land she gave to the National Trust is crossed by Miss James' Walk and in 2009, the Miss James footbridge was constructed across the A3 road.

Life 
Marian Julia James was born on 7 August 1830. She lived in London, boarding in a house with her mother and Miss Emily Coates. In 1888, James became wealthy when her friend Coates died, leaving her an inheritance of around £80,000 (equivalent to £ in ). She then moved to Hindhead in Surrey, buying wooded land and building a house called West Down where she lived with the Bulley family. Between 1892 and 1896, architect George Faulkner Armitage constructed the home along with a coach house and stable, dovecotes and some cottages for the gardeners. James gave some of the land she had bought to the National Trust, which continues to manage it.

Death and legacy 
Miss James died on 10 November 1910. She left an estate of £92,240 (equivalent to £ in ). Among her bequests, she gave West Down to Margaret Hattersley Bulley. She also gave money to churches, hospitals and the Bramshott Chase Hostel, a place set up for single people to have respite care.

On the land she gave to the National Trust is a path, Miss James' Walk, through Nutcombe Valley. The Hindhead Tunnel and approaches enable the A3 road to undershoot its old route along the upper lip of the Devil's Punch Bowl, a Site of Special Scientific Interest. The south approach cuts the Walk. From the beginning of the planning process, the National Trust thus asked for a bridge, a spokesperson saying "We know how important this access between Tyndall's Wood and the rest of Nutcombe Valley will be". The Miss James footbridge was completed in 2009. It is earth-lain and provides a crossing for animals, pedestrians and horse riders.

References 

1830 births
1910 deaths
People from Hindhead
English women philanthropists
19th-century British philanthropists
19th-century women philanthropists